Čechie Karlín was a Czechoslovak football club from the town of Karlín – later incorporated into the city of Prague. The club played sporadically in the Czechoslovak First League between its inaugural season in 1925, and 1951, when it appeared in the top division for the last time. Founded in 1898, it was one of the first football clubs in the country. In 2004 the club merged with TJ Dubeč to form a new club called Čechie Dubeč.

Historical names 
1898 Sportovní kroužek Slavoj Karlín
1899 Čechie Karlín
1948 Sokol Čechie Karlín
1950 Sokol OD Karlín
1951 Sokol ČKD Dukla Karlín
1953 Spartak Karlín Dukla
1967 Čechie Karlín
1996 Čechie Karlín BVB
2002 Čechie Karlín

References

Karlin, Cechie
Karlin, Cechie
Karlin, Cechie
Association football clubs established in 1898
Association football clubs disestablished in 2004
Karlin, Cechie